{{DISPLAYTITLE:C36H44N4O8}}
The molecular formula C36H44N4O8 (molar mass: 660.75 g/mol, exact mass: 660.315914 u) may refer to:

 Coproporphyrinogen I
 Coproporphyrinogen III

Molecular formulas